Ronnie Bull may refer to:

 Ronnie Bull (footballer) (born 1980), English footballer
 Ronnie Bull (American football) (born 1940), retired American football running back